Paul Van Den Abeele (born 10 May 1965) is a Belgian windsurfer. He competed in the men's Lechner A-390 event at the 1992 Summer Olympics.

References

1965 births
Living people
Belgian male sailors (sport)
Belgian windsurfers
Olympic sailors of Belgium
Sailors at the 1992 Summer Olympics – Lechner A-390
Sportspeople from Ghent